Frances Helen Manners, Dowager Duchess of Rutland (née Sweeny; born 1937), is a British peeress and the widow of Charles Manners, 10th Duke of Rutland. Following her husband's death in 1999, she has been known as The Dowager Duchess of Rutland.

Early life and family
Frances Helen Sweeny was born in 1937 in Marylebone Lane, London, to American amateur golfer, socialite and businessman Charles Francis Sweeny and his wife, Scottish debutante Margaret Whigham. Her mother had suffered eight miscarriages and given birth to a stillborn daughter prior to her birth. She was baptised in the Roman Catholic Church on 21 July 1937 at the Brompton Oratory. She had one younger brother, Brian Charles Sweeny (1940–2021).

Her parents divorced in 1947 and her mother subsequently married the 11th Duke of Argyll in 1951.

Marriage and family
On 15 May 1958, Sweeny married Charles Manners, 10th Duke of Rutland at Caxton Hall. They had four children:

 David Charles Robert Manners, 11th Duke of Rutland (b. 8 May 1959), married Emma Watkins, and has issue
 Lord Robert George Manners (18 June 1961 – 28 February 1964)
 Lady Helen Theresa Margaret Manners (b. 11 November 1962), married Dr. John Chipman, and had issue
 Lord Edward John Francis Manners (b. 29 May 1965), married Gabrielle Ross, and had issue

The Duchess was widowed in 1999.

References

Living people
1937 births
English socialites
English duchesses by marriage
English Roman Catholics
English people of Scottish descent
English people of American descent
People from Marylebone
Frances